Ultimate X is a limited series from Marvel Comics written by Jeph Loeb with pencils by Art Adams, originally planned as an ongoing bi-monthly series.

The story picks up after the events in Ultimatum and serves as a quasi-sequel/spin-off of Ultimate X-Men. Originally scheduled to be published bi-monthly, alternating months with Loeb's other Ultimate title Ultimate Comics: New Ultimates, X had long repeated delays, and became instead a prologue to Ultimate Comics: X-Men.

Characters
 Jimmy Hudson: The son of Wolverine, and adopted son of the Hudsons. He has a healing factor and retractable claws, which he is able to cover with organic metal, much like Colossus.
 Karen Grant/Jean Grey: A former member of the X-Men, Jean assumes the name of Karen Grant.
 Derek Morgan: A young mutant from Chicago. He is able to fly by growing a pair of birdlike wings which can be retracted. When he grows his wings out, his eyes turn red, his fingernails grow into talons, and his canine teeth appear to become sharp.
 Theodore "Teddy" Allan: Theodore "Teddy" Allan is the son of The Blob and brother of Liz Allen. He inherited his father's powers, such as his voracious super appetite and his extremely strong skin and layers of fat.
 Liz Allen/Firestar: Spider-Man's former classmate who vanished to Southern California after Ultimatum.
 Hulk/Bruce Banner - first introduced to the series in the fifth and final issue of the series.
 Victor Creed/Sabertooth - has a personal vendetta against Jimmy, and viciously attacks him late at night.

Collected Edition

References

External links

 
 Ultimate Comics X #1 Review, IGN